New London is a city in Rusk County, Texas, United States. The population was 958 at the 2020 census.

New London was originally known as just "London". Because Kimble County Texas had already established a US Post Office station named London, the town changed its name to "New London" in 1931.

History
On March 18, 1937, the London School Explosion killed 294 people (most were children). As a result of the disaster, Texas passed laws requiring natural gas to be mixed with a malodorant to provide early warning of any leak. Other states quickly followed. Eventually, the legal requirement for malodorant in natural gas became a legal requirement in the United States.

Geography

New London is located at  (32.256101, –94.931567).

Demographics

As of the 2020 United States census, there were 958 people, 459 households, and 371 families residing in the city.

As of the census of 2000, there were 987 people, 352 households, and 268 families residing in the city. The population density was 114.3 people per square mile (44.1/km). There were 388 housing units at an average density of 44.9/sq mi (17.3/km). The racial makeup of the city was 91.59% White, 4.86% African American, 0.10% Native American, 0.10% Asian, 2.33% from other races, and 1.01% from two or more races. Hispanic or Latino of any race were 4.86% of the population.

There were 352 households, out of which 34.7% had children under the age of 18 living with them, 60.2% were married couples living together, 11.6% had a female householder with no husband present, and 23.6% were non-families. 22.2% of all households were made up of individuals, and 13.1% had someone living alone who was 65 years of age or older. The average household size was 2.65 and the average family size was 3.09.

In the city, the population was spread out, with 28.3% under the age of 18, 6.9% from 18 to 24, 22.5% from 25 to 44, 23.3% from 45 to 64, and 19.0% who were 65 years of age or older. The median age was 39 years. For every 100 females, there were 89.4 males. For every 100 females age 18 and over, there were 82.0 males.

The median income for a household in the city was $28,984, and the median income for a family was $36,979. Males had a median income of $27,981 versus $15,313 for females. The per capita income for the city was $16,009. About 13.5% of families and 16.3% of the population were below the poverty line, including 20.2% of those under age 18 and 10.7% of those age 65 or over.

Education
The city of New London is served by the West Rusk Independent School District.  A very small portion of the city is within the Overton ISD.

In culture
The 2015 historical novel Out of Darkness by Ashley Hope Pérez depicts 1930s New London.

Notable people 
 Sandy Duncan (b. 1946), American actress, comedian, dancer and singer

References

External links

 New London's West Rusk Schools homepage
 Texas Bob's New London, Texas webpage
 The London Museum of New London, TX webpage
 Pictorial history of New London, Texas

Cities in Texas
Cities in Rusk County, Texas
Longview metropolitan area, Texas